is major one among the two railway stations that serves the town of Baneswar, Cooch Behar district in the Indian state of West Bengal. The other smaller station is  New Baneswar is 11 kms away from the city of Alipurduar and 08 kms away from Cooch Behar.
The station lies on the New Jalpaiguri–New Bongaigaon section of Barauni–Guwahati line of Northeast Frontier Railway. This station falls under Alipurduar railway division.

References

Alipurduar railway division
Railway stations in West Bengal
Railway stations in Cooch Behar district